Oshinow Lake, or Deep Lake, is a lake located north of Great Central Lake on Vancouver Island, British Columbia, Canada.

History 
Appearing on maps as early as 1923 the local indigenous name was thought to be from "oshinoweth", meaning "all kinds of game". The Alberni District Historical Society confirmed in 1988 the established local name of the lake was "Oshinow", meaning "deep". Records from the 1930 BC Gazetteer also refer to the lake as "Oshinaw".

References

Alberni Valley
Lakes of Vancouver Island
Strathcona Provincial Park
Clayoquot Land District